The Hiller Building, also known as the Schick Apartments, is located on the edge of downtown Davenport, Iowa, United States. The Federal style building is a row house. It was individually listed on the National Register of Historic Places in 1974. In 1983 it was included as a contributing property in the West Third Street Historic District.

History
The property on which the building stands is in the oldest section of the city. It was purchased by John Hiller from Davenport founder and developer Antoine LeClaire in 1847. Hiller himself was a builder who is responsible for the construction of the Clock Tower building on the Rock Island Arsenal. This row house was built in three sections in 1852, 1856, and 1859. The expansion reflected the city's population explosion in the 1850s. Because there was a need for rental properties, Hiller expanded his own home and rented out the extra rooms. It is not certain which of the three sections is the original. The Schick family bought the building from the Hillers in 1902. It is believed that this is one of the oldest extant buildings in Davenport.

The building has sat empty since 2015 and it has been on Davenport's "repair or demolish" list since 2016. Its south wall is bowing, crackling and it is losing some of its stones.

Architecture
The two-story rectangular structure houses apartments that are symmetrically arranged along interior corridors. The north wall is composed of stone laid in ashlar fashion and covered in stucco. There are rough irregular shaped stones on the basement level and on the upper two floors of the main façade. The north side of the façade features stone pilasters with mock capital wood crowns that flank the entranceway. The northeast corner has stone quoins. The sidewalls and one in the middle are stepped at the top and the structure is topped with a gabled roof. For the most part, the interior retains its original layout and woodwork, including staircases.

References

Residential buildings completed in 1859
Federal architecture in Iowa
Apartment buildings on the National Register of Historic Places in Iowa
Apartment buildings in Davenport, Iowa
National Register of Historic Places in Davenport, Iowa
Individually listed contributing properties to historic districts on the National Register in Iowa